The Bedford M series is a line of commercial vehicle chassis, the first variants of which were made in 1939 by Bedford. It is a normal control 4-wheel chassis designed to carry loads of 2-3 tons. There were two wheelbase lengths offered – 10' 0" or 11' 11" – and each was fitted with the standard 6-cylinder 27.34 hp petrol engine. A 4-speed gearbox with single dry plate clutch delivered power to a floating rear axle with spiral bevel final drive. Brakes were Lockheed hydraulic type and servo assisted operating on all four wheels.

Variants

Lorry
Seven variants of the M-series chassis were offered. Their designations were: 
MS - short (10'0") wheelbase
MSZ : chassis only
MSC : chassis and cab
MSD : dropside lorry
MST : end tipper
ML - long (11'11") wheelbase
MLZ : chassis only
MLC : chassis and cab
MLD : dropside lorry

Bus
In the years between the deletion of the WHB small bus in the mid 1930s and the introduction of the Bedford CA, the limited 12–16 seat bus market demand was met by examples of the M series, either MLC or MLZ. Plaxton converted some of the latter to forward control in the 1950s using the same scaled down Consort body as fitted to similar Austin or Karrier buses, whilst an MLC converted to a 12-seat school bus by Lee Motors for Dorset County Council survives in preservation.

External links
 The Bedford Truck Legend Register

M Series